Kim Tu-il (Korean: 김두일) is a North Korean politician. He is a member of the Central Committee of the Workers' Party of Korea and Chairman of the Provincial Party Committee of South Pyongan Province.

Biography
After serving as Vice-Chairman of the South Pyongan Province Party Committee, on October 7, 2017, at the second Plenum of the 7th Central Committee of the Workers' Party of Korea he was elected a member of the Central Committee and Chairman of the South Pyongan Province Party Committee. He was elected to the 14th convocation of the Supreme People's Assembly representing Saedok electoral district. He was member of the funeral committee of Kim Yong-chun.

References

Members of the Supreme People's Assembly
Year of birth missing (living people)
Living people
Members of the 8th Politburo of the Workers' Party of Korea
Members of the 8th Central Committee of the Workers' Party of Korea